On the morning of 18 March 2019, three people were killed and seven others were injured in a mass shooting on a tram in Utrecht, Netherlands. One of the injured died of his injuries ten days later. Gökmen Tanis, a 37-year-old Turkish man, was arrested later that day following a major security operation and manhunt. He was later convicted of murder with terrorist intent and sentenced to life in prison. The shooting was classified as an act of Islamic extremism.

Attack 
At about 10:45 CET (09:45 UTC), a shooting took place on a light rail near the 24 Oktoberplein junction in Utrecht. The shooter fled in a car, leading to a large scale police manhunt, which lasted for much of the day. Several hours later, the police arrested Gökmen Tanis, a 37-year-old man born in Turkey. In addition, two further arrests were made in connection to the shooting. Police impounded a red Renault Clio in connection with the attack.

Initially, it was reported that one of the women shot may have been the target due to "family reasons" and other passengers coming to her aid were then also targeted. However, law enforcement later announced there was no evidence of any connection between Tanis and the victims. Instead, a note found in the getaway car hinted at terrorism being the motive.

Victims
Three people were killed and seven others were injured, three severely. The injured were taken to the University Medical Center Utrecht. The three people killed were identified as two men from Utrecht aged 49 and 28, and a 19-year-old woman from the nearby city of Vianen. A neighbour of the murdered 19-year-old started a crowd-funding action to cover the costs of her funeral, reaching the target within hours. It received so many donations that it was turned into a fund for all of the victims of the attack.

A 74-year-old man injured in the shooting died of his injuries on 28 March, bringing the death toll to four.

Perpetrator
Tanis was arrested after a manhunt on the day of the attack.

Tanis grew up in Turkey and came to the Netherlands in 1993 with his parents and two brothers. His parents divorced in 2008 and since then he has lost contact with his father. Until 2017, he lived mainly with his mother. In the Utrecht neighborhood Kanaleneiland, Tanis is known for his hair color as 'De Rode Turk' or 'Lokman'. As of 2011, Tanis has been intermittently addicted to hard drugs. According to his family and local residents, he was very aggressive when he used drugs, and, apart from his interactions with other drug users, he was almost always seen alone. In the periods between his addictions he focused more on his Islamic faith.  At the time of his arrest, Tanis was about to be evicted from a rent arrears, and he also had outstanding fines. He lived alone at the time, but was engaged and had wedding plans.

On 22 March 2019, Tanis confessed to being the sole perpetrator of the shooting. Another suspect was arrested but then released. A letter found in the hijacked car the suspect fled in suggested terrorist motivations; some witnesses claimed they heard the suspect say "Allahu akbar". The public prosecutor charged the suspect with four counts of murder with a terrorist motive.

Two weeks before the attack, Tanis was on trial for a sexual offence committed in 2017.

On 1 July 2019, the contents of the found letter were made public. The letter read: "I am doing this for my religion. You people are killing Muslims and want to take my religion away from me. You will not succeed in that. Allah is great." (Dutch: "Ik doe dit voor mijn religie. Jullie mensen vermoorden Moslims en willen mijn religie van mij wegnemen. Jullie zullen daar niet in slagen. Allah is geweldig.") 

On 20 March 2020, Tanis was sentenced to life in prison.

On 17 February 2021, Tanis stabbed a prison guard in prison De Schie in Rotterdam. The guard was stabbed with a home-made stabbing weapon in his face and neck. His minor injuries were treated in the hospital.

Aftermath
After the attack, the threat level in the province of Utrecht was unprecedentedly raised to level 5, the highest level. After the suspect was caught, it was reduced to Level 4. Police presence was increased at railway stations, including Amsterdam, Rotterdam, The Hague, and Utrecht, and at the country's airports. Tram services in the city were cancelled. Elite police forces carrying semi-automatic weapons guarded Jewish community buildings. Mosques in the city were evacuated, and those elsewhere in the country were given increased security, likely due to the recent mosque shootings in New Zealand.

The day after the shooting, all national flags on government buildings in the Netherlands and at Dutch diplomatic posts were flown at half-mast on request of Prime Minister Mark Rutte. Dutch royal residences flew a black banner, symbolising mourning, alongside the customary royal standard.

2023 Commemoration
On 18 March 2023 the 2019 shooting was publicly commemorated by a speech by Mayor Sharon Dijksma near the location of the shooting. Flowers were laid down, and a special poem by city poet Ruben van Gogh was inaugurated. Due to the COVID-19 pandemic, no yearly commemorations were held in previous years. Dutch Minister of Justice and Security Dilan Yeşilgöz-Zegerius was present at the ceremony.

References

External links
 

2019 crimes in the Netherlands
History of Utrecht (city)
Terrorist incidents in the Netherlands
March 2019 crimes in Europe
March 2019 events in the Netherlands
Mass murder in the Netherlands
Mass shootings in the Netherlands
2019 mass shootings in Europe
Islamic terrorism in the Netherlands
Islamic terrorist incidents in 2019
Events in Utrecht (city)